Ka (कK) (कवर्ण kavarna) is the first consonant of the Devanagari abugida. It ultimately arose from the Brahmi letter 𑀓, after having gone through the Gupta letter . Letters that derive from it are the Gujarati letter ક, and the Modi letter 𑘎.

Usage
In the following example, क implements its inherent vowel, the schwa:
नकली = nakali  "fake"

In this example, क deletes the inherent schwa for correct pronunciation:
बकवास = bakvās  "nonsense"

Certain words that have been borrowed from Persian and Arabic implement the nukta to more properly approximate the original word. It is then transliterated as a q.
क़दम = qadam  "footstep"

Conjuncts with क
क + त(t̪) gives us क्त kt̪ with a somewhat irregular form.

क + ष(ʂ) gives us the fully ligated क्ष kʂ with a very irregular form.

ङ(ŋ) + क gives us the vertical conjunct ङ्क ŋk with the ङ placed above the क.

क + ख(kʰ) gives us क्ख kkʰ with the क placed above the ख.
क + क gives us क्क with the क placed above another क.

क + ल(l̪) gives us क्ल kl̪ with the क placed above the ल.

क + व(ʋ) gives us क्व kʋ with the क placed above the व.

क + न(n̪) gives us क्न kn̪ with the न rotated and placed under the hook of the क.

क + र [ɾ] is a fully ligated (irregular) conjunct

Mathematics

Āryabhaṭa numeration

Aryabhata used Devanagari letters for numbers, very similar to that of the Greeks, even after the invention of Indian numerals.
The values of the different forms of क are:
क  = 1 (१)
कि  = 100 (१००)
कु  = 10,000 (१० ०००)
कृ  = 1,000,000 (१० ०० ०००)
कॢ  = 10 (१०८)
के  = 10 (१०१०)
कै  = 10 (१०१२)
को  = 10 (१०१४)
कौ  = 10 (१०१६)

Tabla Strokes

क (ka) also seen as कि (ki), or के (ke). This is usually a flat, nonresonant stroke of the left hand. The heel of the hand is left on the drum, while the hand rotates to hit the drum, with the focus of the force being focused between the tips and first joints of the fingers.

Hindu astrology

के (ke) is the abbreviation used for केतु (Ketu), the descending lunar node. In Hindu astrology Ketu represents karmic collections both good and bad, spirituality and supernatural influences. Ketu is associated with the Matsya Avatar (Fish Incarnation) of Vishnu.  Ketu signifies the spiritual process of the refinement of materialization to spirit and is considered both malefic and benefic, as it causes sorrow and loss, and yet at the same time turns the individual to God. In other words, it causes material loss in order to force a more spiritual outlook in the person. Ketu is a karaka or indicator of intelligence, wisdom, non-attachment, fantasy, penetrating insight, derangement, and psychic abilities. Ketu is believed to bring prosperity to the devotee's family, removes the effects of snakebite and illness arising out of poisons. He grants good health, wealth and cattle to his devotees.

See also 
 Ka (Javanese)
 Ka (Egyptian soul), ancient Egyptian concept of spirit or soul

References

 Kurt Elfering: Die Mathematik des Aryabhata I. Text, Übersetzung aus dem Sanskrit und Kommentar. Wilhelm Fink Verlag, München, 1975, 
 Georges Ifrah: The Universal History of Numbers. From Prehistory to the Invention of the Computer. John Wiley & Sons, New York, 2000, .
 B. L. van der Waerden: Erwachende Wissenschaft. Ägyptische, babylonische und griechische Mathematik. Birkhäuser-Verlag, Basel Stuttgart, 1966, 
 
 

Devanagari letters